The Royal Infirmary of Edinburgh (RIE), often (but incorrectly) known as the Edinburgh Royal Infirmary (ERI), was established in 1729 and is the oldest voluntary hospital in Scotland. The new buildings of 1879 were claimed to be the largest voluntary hospital in the United Kingdom, and later on, the Empire. The hospital moved to a new 900 bed site in 2003 in Little France. It is the site of clinical medicine teaching as well as a teaching hospital for the University of Edinburgh Medical School. In 1960, the first successful kidney transplant performed in the UK was at this hospital.  In 1964, the world's first coronary care unit was established at the hospital. It is the only site for liver, pancreas and pancreatic islet cell transplantation and one of two sites for kidney transplantation in Scotland. In 2012, the Emergency Department had 113,000 patient attendances, the highest number in Scotland. It is managed by NHS Lothian.

History

Foundation and early history
John Munro, President of the Incorporation of Surgeons in 1712, set in motion a project to establish a "Seminary of Medical Education" in Edinburgh, of which a General Hospital was an integral part. His son, Alexander Monro primus, by then Professor of Anatomy, circulated an anonymous pamphlet in 1721 on the necessity and advantage of erecting a hospital for the sick and poor. In 1725, the Royal College of Physicians of Edinburgh wrote to the stock-holders of the Fishery Company, which was about to be wound up, suggesting that they assign their shares for the purpose of such a hospital. Other donors included many wealthy citizens, most of the physicians and several surgeons, numerous Church of Scotland parishes (at the urging of their Assembly) and the Episcopal meeting houses in Edinburgh.

The committee set up by the donors leased "a house of small rent" near the college from the university for 19 years. Known, at first, as the Hospital for the Sick Poor, the Physicians' Hospital, or Little House, it was established on 6 August 1729 at the head of Robertson's Close on the site of the building on the corner of South Bridge and Infirmary Street. It is now marked with a plaque.

A "gentlewoman" was engaged as Mistress or House-keeper, and a "Nurse or Servant" was hired for the patients, both women to be resident and "free of the burden of children and the care of a separate family." The physicians, who had seen the poor gratis twice weekly at their college, arranged for one of their number to attend the hospital, to see both inpatients and outpatients. Six Surgeon-Apothecaries (Alexander Monro, John McGill, Francis Congalton, Robert Hope, John Douglas and George Cunninghame) also agreed to attend in turn, and to dispense the medicines prescribed by the physicians from their own shops, also without payment.

The first patient, a lady from Caithness, was suffering from "chlorosis." She was discharged and recovered after three months. Thirty five patients were admitted in the first year, of whom 19 were cured, 5 recovered, 5 dismissed, either as incurable or for irregularities, and one died in the hospital (of "consumption"). They came from all over Scotland, but mainly from Edinburgh and its environs. Diseases cured included pains, inflammations, agues, ulcers, cancers, palsies, flux, consumption, hysterick disorders and melancholy. A free advice and medicine service for out-patients was very popular, receiving a 1,000 patients by 1754, which presented the hospital with prohibitively high costs and demand. Fundraising began for a new hospital, driven by Monro and Drummond, and the appeal attracted funds from churches throughout Scotland, landed gentry, private individuals, and prominent professionals including physicians, surgeons, merchants and lawyers, as well as donations of labour and building materials.

Infirmary Street

The infirmary received a Royal Charter from George II in 1736 which gave it its name of the Royal Infirmary of Edinburgh and commissioned William Adam to design a new hospital on a site close by to the original building, on what later became Infirmary Street. In 1741 the hospital moved the short distance to the not yet completed building which eventually, on its completion in 1745, had 228 beds compared to 4 beds in the Little House.

By the 1830s, the hospital had become short of space and, in 1832, the former Royal High School in nearby High School Yards, built by Alexander Laing in 1777, was converted to a surgical hospital with a new operating theatre built to the east. This was soon found to be inadequate and a new surgical hospital, designed by David Bryce, was built fronting Drummond Street, opening in 1853. The new building was linked to the High School Yards building by an extension to the north.

The Infirmary Street buildings were demolished in 1884 and replaced with public swimming baths and a school. The ornamental gates and gate piers now front the former surgical hospital on Drummond Street. The four attached Ionic columns on the frontispiece of the hospital were removed and incorporated as a combined column in a monument to the Covenanters who were defeated at the Battle of Rullion Green. This stands outside the entrance to Dreghorn Barracks on Redford Road in the south west of the city.

The original surgical theatre, which was on the roof of the 1741 building, was re-erected as part of stables in the grounds of Redford House, also on Redford Road. It has since been converted into a house known as Drummond Scrolls taking its name from the large attached carved bracket scrolls, also from the surgical theatre of 1741. The house is category B-listed by Historic Scotland.

The New System
Significant changes came with the introduction of the "New System" in 1873.  Four years before, Sir Joseph Lister had been appointed as Professor of Surgery to the Royal Infirmary of Edinburgh. Using antiseptics and narcotics he proved to be very successful, thus attracting patients from higher social classes to the hospital. The hospital managers felt the existing nurses were lacking both medical knowledge and appropriate behaviour. They appointed Deputy Surgeon-General Charles Hamilton Fasson as Medical Superintendent. Fasson recruited a group of 17 trained Nightingale Nurses from St. Thomas’s Hospital London. In 1873 Elizabeth Barclay and Angélique Lucille Pringle started building up a system of nursing where the nurses were under the control of the Lady Superintendent of Nurses instead of individual ward doctors. They also introduced a systematic training of nurses, who were, after one year of probation, admitted to the Royal Infirmary of Edinburgh’s Register Book. Accordingly, the Royal Infirmary of Edinburgh had implemented the first Scottish nursing school. Up to the movement into the new buildings 102 probationers had been entered into the Royal Infirmary of Edinburgh’s Registry Book.

Lauriston Place

In 1871 a new Superintendent, Charles Hamilton Fasson, was placed in overall charge of the Drummond Street infirmary but felt a new hospital was required on modern standards, and convinced Edinburgh Town council to underwrite the cost of a new infirmary on Lauriston Place. He oversaw the design and construction and remained Superintendent of the new infirmary until his death in 1892.

In 1879, at the instruction of the then Lord Provost, Thomas Jamieson Boyd, the infirmary moved to a new location, then in the fresher air of the edge of the city. The site, on Lauriston Place, had been occupied by George Watson's Hospital (a school, known then as a hospital). The school moved a short distance away to the former Merchant Maiden Hospital (another school) in Archibald Place. The original school building, by the same William Adam as the earlier infirmary, was incorporated into the new David Bryce-designed infirmary buildings and the chapel remained in use for the entirety of the infirmary's occupation of the site.

In the 1920s, the hospital needed to expand, and once again George Watson's College was asked to move. An arrangement was reached to acquire the school's site, with the school to remain there until new premises could be built elsewhere. By 1932, the school's new premises in Colinton Road were ready, and the old Archibald Place building was demolished to make way for the Simpson Memorial Pavilion, used primarily as a maternity wing. In 1948, the infirmary was incorporated into the National Health Service (NHS). The liver transplant unit opened in 1992.

In May 2001, Lothian Health Trust sold the  Lauriston Place site for £30 million to Southside Capital Ltd., a consortium comprising Taylor Woodrow, Kilmartin Property Group, and the Bank of Scotland. It has been redeveloped as the Quartermile housing, shopping, leisure and hotel development. Much of the David Bryce infirmary will remain visible, but some infirmary buildings have been demolished. In the build-up to the move to Little France, the Royal Charter awarded by George II in 1736 was rediscovered.

Little France
A new hospital, sited on a mostly green field site at Little France in the south-east of the city, was procured under a Private Finance Initiative contract in 1998. The new location reflected the need for the hospital to serve not just people living in Edinburgh, but also Midlothian and East Lothian. The new hospital is physically linked to the Chancellor's Building, the main teaching facility for the University of Edinburgh Medical School. The new building, which was designed by Keppie Design and constructed by Balfour Beatty at a cost of £184 million, opened in 2003. The building was built without air conditioning, and portable units are required for the summer months.

The Little France site initially attracted some controversy in the local media, such as the Edinburgh Evening News, not least because the city's main accident and emergency facilities are some distance from the city centre, and also because the public transport links to the site had been criticised as inadequate. Also Jim and Margaret Cuthbert, economic consultants, unveiled evidence in the Scottish Left Review outlining why the PFI scheme was a poor use of public funds whilst resulting in huge profits for private investors.

In 2012, the hospital began TAVI procedures, the first time this offered in Scotland. On 16 November 2014, the University announced the Royal Infirmary as the location of Scotland's first PET-MRI Scanner.

In 2016, the Royal Infirmary of Edinburgh became one of four major trauma centres where specialist services are based as part of a new national major trauma network in Scotland. In 2021, the Royal Hospital for Children and Young People opened on the Little France site adjacent to the Infirmary, this being a replacement for the former Royal Hospital for Sick Children in Sciennes.

In 2020, the hospital saw the Department for Clinical Neurosciences move to the Little France site having previously been based at Western General Hospital; senior doctors condemned the move in the middle of the COVID-19 crisis as "incomprehensible".

Achievements
1960 - First kidney transplant in the UK by Sir Michael Woodruff 
1964 - World's first Coronary Care Unit established by Desmond Julian
2000 - Scotland's first combined kidney and pancreas transplant 
2008 - Scotland's first live donor liver transplant by Murat Akyol and Ernest Hidalgo 
2011 - Scotland's first pancreatic islet cell transplantation 
2012 - Scotland's first transcatheter aortic valve replacement performed by Neal Uren

The Infirmary in literature
The Royal Infirmary of Edinburgh has often been described in works of fiction, biography and history, and depicted from both the point of view of the sick and those caring for them. The English poet William Ernest Henley e.g.  stayed as a patient at the RIE for three years (1873–75). In several poems he portrayed hospital life as well as individual nurses.

Famous patients
 Former UK Prime Minister Gordon Brown had experimental eye surgery performed as a young undergraduate at the University of Edinburgh to save his right eye after suffering from retinal detachment after a rugby union accident.
 Leader of the Scottish Conservatives, Ruth Davidson gave birth to a baby boy on 26 October 2018; she and her partner, Jen, named their son Finn.

See also
 Western General Hospital
 Royal Hospital for Sick Children, Edinburgh
 Longmore Hospital

References

External links 

 
 Royal Infirmary of Edinburgh on the NHS inform website
 Healthcare Improvement Scotland inspection reports
 Engraving of Lauriston Place buildings from the Edinburgh Photographic Society
 Development of the Quartermile project

Royal Infirmary of Edinburgh
1729 establishments in Scotland
NHS Scotland hospitals
Buildings and structures completed in 1741
Hospital buildings completed in the 18th century
Hospital buildings completed in 1853
Hospitals in Edinburgh
Organisations based in Edinburgh with royal patronage
Hospitals established in the 1720s
University of Edinburgh
NHS Lothian
Voluntary hospitals